Panagiotis Konstantinopoulos (born 5 September 1995) is a Greek professional footballer who plays as a midfielder for Super League 2 club Kalamata.

Career
Coming out of the Panetolikos youth academy, Konstantinopoulos signed his first professional contract on 28 August 2014.  He made his Superleague Greece debut on 9 November 2015, coming off the bench against PAS Giannina.

On 9 September 2016, he signed a contract with Achaiki.

On 15 February 2019, he joined Ialysos. After a six-month tenure in Ialysos, he joined Kalamata F.C. on a free transfer.

On 30 June 2021, his contract with the club was extended for two more years.

References

External links
Profile   at Superleaguegreece.org

1995 births
Living people
Greek footballers
Panetolikos F.C. players
Anagennisi Karditsa F.C. players
A.E. Sparta P.A.E. players
Kalamata F.C. players
Association football midfielders
People from Achaea
Footballers from Western Greece